Hammerax is an American percussion and cymbal manufacturer, launched in 2006 headed by Audio engineer John Stannard. Hammerax is known for their unique percussive creations and unusual instrument designs, which have received mixed reviews from customers.

Notable users of their cymbals include Terry Bozzio and Danny Carey.

Products
Its cymbals, which have been crafted in many unique and patented or patent pending forms, are particularly noted. Hammerax's private collection includes at least 50 instruments, some of which were experimental test prototypes.

See also
Cymbals

Notes

External links
 
 
 Hammerax liquid 22" ride Patent pending via YouTube

Cymbal manufacturing companies
Musical instrument manufacturing companies of the United States
Percussion instrument manufacturing companies
American companies established in 2006
Manufacturing companies based in Florida
Companies based in Clearwater, Florida